Harvey Clark may refer to:

Harvey Clark (actor) (1885–1938), American actor from Boston
Harvey L. Clark (1807–1858), missionary from Vermont, pioneer in Oregon, United States